LRZ may refer to:

 Louis Rees-Zammit
 Low Rainfall Zone
 Leibniz-Rechenzentrum, German computing facility
 Landesrundfunkzentrale Mecklenburg-Vorpommern, German regional media authority
 The file extension used by lrzip